Jordan Vineyard & Winery is a family-owned California winery located in  Alexander Valley AVA in Sonoma County. Jordan produces Alexander Valley Cabernet Sauvignon and Russian River Valley Chardonnay.

History 

Jordan Vineyard & Winery was founded in 1972 by Tom and Sally Jordan, who first purchased land in 1972 with the dream of planting a vineyard. The Jordan chateau, which overlooks nearly 1,200 acres of hills and vineyards with three quarters of the land dedicated to natural habitat, was designed by the architecture firm Backen, Arrigoni & Ross and was completed in 1976 just before the first vintage of Jordan was harvested.

Jordan's current winemaker is Maggie Kruse. Its winemaker emeritus, Rob Davis, is considered the longest-tenured winemaker in Sonoma County, working at Jordan from 1976 until his retirement in 2019. Davis was hired and mentored by winemaker André Tchelistcheff, who served as consulting enologist for Jordan. Jordan is one of the few wineries that makes only two wines—a Russian River Valley Chardonnay and an Alexander Valley Cabernet Sauvignon. The house style is considered more French than Californian with balance and elegance with lower alcohol and silky tannins.

Today, the winery is owned and operated by Tom and Sally Jordan's son, John. John Jordan's older sister Judy Jordan owned J Vineyards until 2015.

Jordan is known for its emphasis on sustainability and social responsibility. Most of the Jordan Estate is preserved habitat for wildlife and native trees. The winery is certified sustainable and runs on solar power, and all estate and grower vineyards are Sonoma Sustainable.  Funds from the winery are used by The John Jordan Foundation, created in 2012 to fight the effective effects of poverty. 

In September 2013, the 1,200-acre Jordan Estate became open to the public to explore for the first time in its history through an Estate Tour & Tasting experience.

References

External links

Wineries in Sonoma County
Healdsburg, California
1972 establishments in California